Bohumil Kubišta (21 August 1884 in Vlčkovice, Bohemia – 27 November 1918 in Prague) was a Czech painter and art critic, one of the founders of Czech modern painting. He studied at the Academy of Fine Arts in Prague, but left in 1906 to study at the Reale Istituto di Belle Arti in Florence. He, Emil Filla, Antonín Procházka, and five others founded Osma (The Eight), an Expressionist-oriented group of artists.

Work 
Kubišta came to his individual expression gradually, at first he was influenced by the work of Vincent van Gogh and Paul Cézanne. He educated himself in philosophy and optics, and studied colour and the geometrical construction of painting.

Kubišta, like several other Czech artists of his generation, was strongly affected by the 1905 Edvard Munch exhibition in Prague. Together with Emil Filla he established the artistic group Osma in 1906 or 1907. He worked in an Expressionist style until 1910, and exchanged ideas with German painters in Die Brücke. He also developed visual ideas learned from the work of Cézanne. His later style (approximately from 1911) was strongly influenced by Expressionism and Cubism. Expressionist elements, particularly his use of colour but also his subject matter, immediately distinguish Kubišta's Cubist work (such as his 1912 St Sebastian) from that of founding Paris Cubists Picasso, Braque and the Section d'Or. He studied colour theory, analyzing the harmonic and compositional principles of painters such as El Greco, Eugène Delacroix, Vincent van Gogh, and Edvard Munch. He also paid close attention to mathematical and geometric principles. Around 1911, he became acquainted with Jan Zrzavý and the artistic group Sursum.

Kubišta joined the army in 1913. He died during the global 1918 flu pandemic which ravaged Europe during and after the First World War.

Paintings

References and sources
References

Sources
Nešlehová, Mahulena: Bohumil Kubišta. Prague: Odeon, 1984.
Černá, Marie: Dějiny výtvarného umění. Prague: Idea Servis, 2005. 
Jörg Deuter, Zweimal Prager Frühling. Über eine Ausstellung, die nicht sein durfte, und über Bohumil Kubista und die Maler der "Brücke". Buchholz 2019.

External links
 
Bohumil Kubišta, paintings in museums and public art galleries worldwide, Artcyclopedia

1884 births
1918 deaths
20th-century Czech painters
Czech male painters
Cubist artists
People from Hradec Králové District
Deaths from Spanish flu
20th-century Czech male artists